Shopping Conjunto Nacional (Joint National Mall) is the first shopping center in Brasília, and the second mall to be built in Brazil. It was opened in 1971 and is located near the bus station in the Central Zone of Brasília. It is the largest mall in the Federal District and is among the top 30 of Brazil, with 320 stores and 118,100 square meters built.

External links 

 http://www.conjuntonacional.com.br/

Shopping malls in Brasília
Shopping malls established in 1971
Buildings and structures in Brasília
Tourist attractions in Brasília
1971 establishments in Brazil